Artur Alberto Ferreira Fonte (born 8 August 1959) is a Portuguese former footballer who played as a left back.

Club career
Born in Lisbon, Fonte spent 12 seasons in the Primeira Liga, playing 290 matches for F.C. Penafiel (three spells), C.F. Os Belenenses and Vitória de Setúbal. He made his debut in the competition on 23 August 1980 whilst at the service of the first club, in a 1–0 home win against C.S. Marítimo.

Also with Penafiel, in the 1988–89 campaign, Fonte appeared in a career-best 35 games to help his team to the 14th position. He retired at the age of 33, after one year in the lower leagues.

International career
Fonte represented Portugal at the 1978 UEFA European Under-18 Championship and the 1979 FIFA World Youth Championship.

Personal life
Fonte's sons, José and Rui, are also professional footballers.

References

External links

1959 births
Living people
Footballers from Lisbon
Portuguese footballers
Association football defenders
Primeira Liga players
Segunda Divisão players
F.C. Penafiel players
Vitória F.C. players
C.F. Os Belenenses players
Portugal youth international footballers